The Bishop of Down and Connor is an episcopal title which takes its name from the town of Downpatrick (located in County Down) and the village of Connor (located in County Antrim) in Northern Ireland. The title is still used by the Catholic Church for the diocese of that name, but in the Church of Ireland it has been modified into other bishoprics.

History
The sees of Down and Connor were established at the Synod of Rathbreasail in 1111. For a brief period in the early 12th-century, they were united under Máel Máedóc Ua Morgair (Saint Malachy), who also became Archbishop of Armagh.

On 29 July 1438, plans for a permanent union of the sees of Down and Connor were submitted to King Henry VI of England for his sanction. Exactly twelve months later, 29 July 1439, Pope Eugene IV issued a papal bull stating that Down and Connor were to be united on the death or resignation of either bishop. In 1442, Bishop John Sely of Down was deprived of his see by Pope Eugene IV, thereby effecting the union of the two dioceses. John Fossade, who had been bishop of Connor since 1431, became the bishop of the united see of Down and Connor in late 1442. However, due to strong opposition to the union in the diocese of Down, three more bishops of Down were appointed, two whilst Fossade was alive and one after his death. It was not until the appointment of Thomas Knight that the two sees were finally united under one bishop.

Following the upheaval of the 16th century Reformation in Ireland, there were parallel apostolic successions. In the Church of Ireland, Down and Connor merged with Dromore in 1842 to form the bishopric of Down, Connor and Dromore. This arrangement continued until 1945 when the dioceses were separated into the bishoprics of Down & Dromore and Connor.

In the Roman Catholic Church, the see of Down and Connor continues to the present day. Since the first half of the nineteenth century the bishop has lived in Belfast rather than the Downpatrick area. The incumbent is the Most Reverend Noel Treanor, Bishop of the Roman Catholic Diocese of Down and Connor, who was appointed by the Holy See on 22 February 2008 and ordained bishop on 29 June 2008.

Lists of bishops

Pre-Reformation bishops

Post-Reformation Church of Ireland bishops

Post-Reformation Roman Catholic bishops

Notes

References

Bibliography

  
 

Down and Connor
Down and Connor
 Bishops
Religion in County Antrim
Religion in County Down
 Bishops
Bishops of Down or Connor or of Dromore
 Bishop